United States gubernatorial elections were held in 1928, in 35 states, concurrent with the House, Senate elections and presidential election, on November 6, 1928 (September 10 in Maine).

Results

See also 
1928 United States elections
1928 United States presidential election
1928 United States Senate elections
1928 United States House of Representatives elections

References 

 
November 1928 events in the United States